Battugudem is a village in Nalgonda district in Telangana, India. It falls under Tipparthi mandal. Around 10 families of same community live in this village. The postal code is 508247. It comes under Yellammagudem gram panchayat.

References

Villages in Nalgonda district